Ahmetli railway station is a railway station in Ahmetli, Turkey. TCDD Taşımacılık operates a daily inter-city train from İzmir to Konya and daily regional trains from İzmir to Alaşehir and Uşak, as well as from Manisa to Alaşehir.

The station was opened on 13 March 1875 as Ahmedli railway station and built by the Smyrna Cassaba Railway as part of their railway from Smyrna (modern day İzmir) to Karahisar.

References

Railway stations in Manisa Province
Railway stations opened in 1875
Buildings and structures in Manisa Province
Transport in Manisa Province